Wilhelm Zoepf, also rendered Zöpf, (11 March 1908 in Munich – 7 July 1980) was a German Schutzstaffel (SS) Sturmbannführer and a figure in the Holocaust.

Early years
Educated at the Maximiliansgymnasium München, Zoepf was a lawyer by profession. He married in 1938 and divorced in 1957. Zoepf joined the Nazi Party in May 1933, also serving with the Hitler Youth until 1936. He joined the SS in 1937.

Netherlands
Zoepf was attached RSHA Referat IV B4 (RSHA Sub-Department IV-B4), the Jewish affairs and deportation agency headed by Adolf Eichmann. In this capacity Zoepf was sent by Eichmann in 1941 to the Netherlands in order to work alongside the Sicherheitspolizei in deportations. Here he became directly subordinate to SS General Wilhelm Harster, the pair being old friends. From their base in The Hague the duo ran the Department of Jewish Affairs for the Nazi occupiers in the Netherlands. In this role Zoepf oversaw the deportation of Jews to the concentration camps in the east. Most of his work was that of a bureaucrat although he took steps to ensure that deportation would not be disrupted, notably intercepting and destroying South American passports that were sent to some Jews and which would save them from deportation.

Post-war
Following the Second World War Zoepf disappeared within the Netherlands and returned to Germany. In the 1960s Zoepf was brought to trial in Munich, along with Harster and Gertrud Slottke for his complicity in the killing of 83,000 Dutch Jews. After a trial that received high media attention Zoepf was sentenced to nine years imprisonment.

References

1908 births
1980 deaths
Holocaust perpetrators in the Netherlands
SS-Sturmbannführer
Nazis convicted of war crimes
Military personnel from Munich
People from the Kingdom of Bavaria
Reich Security Main Office personnel
Hitler Youth members